Viscount Trenchard, of Wolfeton in the County of Dorset, is a title in the Peerage of the United Kingdom. It was created in 1936 for Marshal of the Royal Air Force, Hugh Trenchard, 1st Baron Trenchard. He had already been created a Baronet, of Wolfeton in the County of Dorset, in the Baronetage of the United Kingdom in 1919 and Baron Trenchard, of Wolfeton in the County of Dorset, in 1930, also in the Peerage of the United Kingdom. His second son, the second Viscount, held junior ministerial positions from 1979 to 1983 in the Conservative administration of Margaret Thatcher.  the titles are held by the latter's son, the third Viscount, who succeeded in 1987. In 2004 he replaced the recently deceased Lord Vivian as one of the ninety elected (by hereditary peers) hereditary peers that are allowed to remain in the House of Lords after the passing of the House of Lords Act 1999. Lord Trenchard sits on the Conservative benches.

The family seat is Standon Lordship, near Ware, Hertfordshire.

Viscounts Trenchard (1936)
Hugh Montague Trenchard, 1st Viscount Trenchard (1873–1956)
Thomas Trenchard, 2nd Viscount Trenchard (1923–1987)
Hugh Trenchard, 3rd Viscount Trenchard (b. 1951)

The heir apparent is the present holder's son Hon. Alexander Thomas Trenchard (b. 1978)
The heir apparent’s heir apparent is his son Frederick Hugh Rainer Trenchard (b. 2008)

Notes

References 
Kidd, Charles, Williamson, David (editors). Debrett's Peerage and Baronetage (1990 edition). New York: St Martin's Press, 1990, 

Viscountcies in the Peerage of the United Kingdom
Noble titles created in 1936